is a Japanese tokusatsu television series and the 24th series in Toei's Super Sentai metaseries. Footage from this series was used in the American production Power Rangers Time Force. It aired from February 13, 2000 to February 4, 2001, replacing Kyuukyuu Sentai GoGoFive and was replaced by Hyakujuu Sentai Gaoranger. The opening narration of the series announces, . Timeranger was released on DVD by Shout! Factory in North America on July 31, 2018. This is the 9th Super Sentai Series to be released on Region 1 DVD in North America. The series debuted on February 13, 2000, when it replaced Kyuukyuu Sentai GoGoFive in TV Asahi's 7:30 JST time-slot, joining the recently-debuted Kamen Rider Kuuga in what would 3 years later become the Super Hero Time programming block.

Plot
In the 30th century, time travel becomes illegal after a time paradox crisis. The Time Protection Bureau (TPB) is established to watch for and stop time crimes. Four new enlistee cadets of the TPB are tricked by mafia leader Don Dolnero and his gang into letting them time-travel to the year 2000 to commit various crimes and, to protect history, the four cadets pursue them. They encounter a severe problem: the Timeranger program requires five members for the first operation. They coerce a present-day martial artist, Tatsuya Asami, to join them, and they become the Timerangers. Tatsuya rents a building for them to live in, and they start a small odd-jobs business called Tomorrow Research to financially support themselves.

Over time, the four cadets begin to realize that their presence would inevitably change the future in the form of the City Guardians, a security force under the employment of the Asami Corporation to protect the city from the Londerz. The City Guardians form a tenuous relationship with the Timerangers, especially when Tatsuya's college acquaintance Naoto becomes Time Fire and later also becomes the City Guardian's captain.

Characters

Timerangers

"Timeranger! [Name of prisoner]! Breaking the time travel law is a 1st class criminal offense!"

Tatsuya Asami/Time Red
: The main protagonist of the series, Tatsuya is a 22-year-old martial artist who is "drafted" into the team. He refuses to accept fate and his heritage as future CEO of his father's company. He believes that people can control their own destiny, but only if they fight for a desirable future. After joining the Timerangers, Tatsuya decides to move out of his father's house and uses his savings to rent the building that would be the Timeranger's home. He works as a karate teacher at Tomorrow Research. Although Yuuri is the team leader, Tatsuya is the driving force of the Timerangers, essentially acting as field commander during the battles. When operating the Time Robo formations, Tatsuya is usually in charge of accessing the finishers to recapture the Londerz Prisoners by wielding a miniature version of the Space-Time Sword/Chrono Divider to mimic the movement pattern. In the finale, one year after the final battle, Tatsuya continues to live freely by choosing his lifestyle until he feels that he is ready to join his father's company. At the end of the series, Tatsuya runs into four individuals who resemble Yuuri, Ayase, Domon and Sion, who may be their ancestors, and even an individual who resembles Naoto.
Attacks: ,  with Time Blue,  with Time Yellow,  & .

Yuuri/Time Pink
: The female protagonist of the series and the leader of the Timerangers, she is a 21-year-old police officer from the 30th century. Since the Inter-City Police are aware of Don Dolnero's plan, she goes undercover as a TDB cadet to stop him. She holds a personal grudge against Don Dolnero for sending an assassin to kill her family in 2988. Yuuri is initially cold towards Tatsuya but eventually warms up to him. She works as a detective at Tomorrow Research but is open to other jobs such as cleaning services. In the series finale, she confesses to Tatsuya that she loves him, but they cannot be together due to the large gap between their timelines. Therefore, she returns to her own time and finds that, due to the time change in the 30th century, Dolnero's hit on her family ten years earlier had failed. In the 20th century, Tatsuya came across an individual resembling Yuuri, who may be her ancestor.
Attacks:  & .

Ayase/Time Blue
: A former racer, this calm-headed 22-year-old is the second-in-command with a knack for high-speed battles and a deadpan sense of humor. Often, his humor puts him at odds with Domon, which forces the other Timerangers to prevent a possible fistfight between the two. He is close friends with Tatsuya. As the only Timeranger with a driver's license, he works as a chauffeur at Tomorrow Research. Ayase, however, has the incurable terminal illness Osiris Syndrome. When Tatsuya finds out about the disease, he is determined to help his friend. The other Timerangers are shocked when Tatsuya is forced to reveal Ayase's illness to them. After time is altered at the end of the series, a cure for Osiris Syndrome was found a year earlier and Ayase can be cured. In the 20th century, Tatsuya came across an individual resembling Ayase, who may be his ancestor.
Attacks: ,  with Time Red,  with Time Yellow & .

Domon/Time Yellow
: A 22-year-old womanizer, formerly a professional grappler, who tends to overdo it sometimes. Domon was banned from professional fighting for never being on time for a match because he would chase after girls. Despite this, Domon has great respect for the rules and, after learning that Sion is an orphan, he sticks up for him and refuses to let anyone call him an alien. However, Domon, who comes from a large family, is the only one who truly misses the 30th century, and he has some resentment towards Ryuuya for trapping them in the 20th century. This results in him taking his frustrations out on Tatsuya when the four cadets first meet him due to his resemblance to Ryuuya. Although Domon works as the self-defense teacher at Tomorrow Research, he has no students. Domon argues with Ayase frequently due to the latter's humor towards his attitude on women. However, he does care about him deep down. An emotional Domon wanted Ayase to quit after learning about Ayase's illness, though he reluctantly accepts Ayase's choice of not wanting to quit the team. Later on, Domon falls in love with camerawoman Honami Moriyama. After his secret identity is revealed to her, the two start dating, and Domon eventually tells her that he comes from the 30th century. After the future is changed in the finale, Domon learns that his ban is reduced to a one-year suspension from the ring, which was up by the time he returns to the year 3001. In the 20th century, Tatsuya came across an individual resembling Domon, who may be his ancestor. Domon reappears in Kaizoku Sentai Gokaiger, learning on the occasion that his love affair with Honami also produced a son, referred to as Domon Jr.
Attacks: ,  & .

Sion/Time Green
: A 17-year-old alien from the planet , which was destroyed as the result of war, he was raised on Earth in a laboratory. He is agile and curious about everything around him. Sion is also fond of dyeing his hair, which he has done every so often since age 3. In episodes 1–10, as well as during the opening and ending sequences of the series, his hair was dyed blue/light blue/cyan (aqua)/sky blue, and in episodes 11–51, his hair was dyed brown/light brown/tan color to look like one of the normal people of the 20th century. Due to his alien physiology, Sion only needs to sleep once per year, but he must then spend a week in hibernation. He is the Timerangers' technical expert, capable of operating any machine, and in charge of Tomorrow Research computer repairs. He is the youngest Ranger, born around 2983. In the finale, Sion learns that his history has not changed because he's not from Earth. However, as he leaves, he says he's happy that he met Tatsuya and, thanks to him, he will never feel alone anymore. In the 20th century, Tatsuya came across an individual resembling Sion.
Attacks:  & .

City Guardians
Wataru Asami forms a security force under his Asami Corporation to protect the city from the Londerz. The  gain a tenuous relationship with the Timerangers, especially when Tatsuya's college acquaintance Naoto becomes Time Fire and later the City Guardian's captain. The captain is required to wear a red beret.

Naoto Takizawa/Time Fire
"Time Fire! Londerz, if you keep doing this, I'm not gonna be nice!"
: Tatsuya's 28- year-old rival and leader of the City Guardians established by the Asami Group. Unlike Tatsuya, Naoto came from the other side of the tracks, getting by on a scholarship as the two of them attended college. Naoto envied Tatsuya and wanted to be the better of the two. After Naoto becomes Time Fire, colored red and black, the Asami Group attempts to analyze the technology for mass production, but cannot fully understand the 30th century technology. He finds out through Sion that the Londerz are just prisoners and only need to be recaptured. Eventually, he learns that the Timerangers came from the 30th century and, because of his desire for power, he chooses to find a way to use his new knowledge of the Timerangers to his advantage. After Wataru is hospitalized, Naoto is able to use that knowledge to gain full control of the City Guardians. Naoto also owns two pet birds, Tora and Sakura, which he later gives to a little girl. After Naoto is injured during the battle against NeoCrisis, he finds out that Wataru has forced Ibuki to resign and the City Guardians were able to remove the voice lock function on the V-Commander, which means they no longer need him. However, Naoto flees with the V-Commander. The girl who Naoto gave his birds to is seen trying to rescue the birds. A Zenitt would have killed her, but Naoto protects her and is shot in her stead. At an emergency shelter he is treated for his injuries. When the little girl comes to thank him, they see one of the bird outside. Unaware of how badly he is already injured, Naoto goes out to catch the bird. He succeeds, but is shot down by a Zenitt, which mortally wounds him and causes him to lose his balance and fall over a high stairwell railing. Naoto relinquishes the V-Commander to Tatsuya, telling him to change the way he lives as he dies. In the 20th century, Tatsuya comes across an individual resembling Naoto.

Allies

Ranger Captain: Ryuuya
: TDB commanding officer in 3000, the first Time Red, the original Time Fire, and a descendant of Tatsuya. Later in the series, he travels to 2000 to take over the role of Time Red once more, but returns the changer to Tatsuya soon after. Uninterested in the past, Ryuuya insists that Yuuri and the others return to the future, as the Lambda 2000 intends to cause the Earth in the past to cease to exist. However, once they return, he attempts to erase their memories of their time in 2000–2001, telling the Timerangers how their actions in the past have changed their futures for the better.  However, Yuuri and the others flee just as Ayase confronts and mortally wounds Ryuuya. Ryuuya reveals that, not only is he the one who lets Don Dolnero escape into the past, but everything leading to the Timerangers being formed and Gien's insanity reaching its peak are also planned to ensure that the "better" of the two futures he saw would come to pass. He also reveals that the Timerangers are supposed to die in the first giant battle, and the aid he sends save their lives many times over. The original pilot of the V-Rex, Ryuuya discovers two futures six years earlier when the G-Zord gets lost in space-time, along with him: one with Gien's battle with the V-Rex destroying a third of the 21st century, and another in which Gien's death by the G-Zord leads to the complete destruction of the 31st century. In both futures, however, Ryuuya, as Time Fire, dies. To prevent his demise, Ryuuya sets up the V-Rex's disappearance to ensure that someone from the past will become Time Fire and die in his place. However, his actions merely change the manner in which he dies, and when he dies. Before his death, he asks how he could possibly be blamed for doing what he did, saying that he wanted to do what the Timerangers were doing for themselves: to make a better future.

Masaru Nagai portrays Ryuuya as well as Tatsuya in a dual role.

Navigator Robo Tac
: A robotic owl who transmits the launch of the Time Jets. He has a database on all Londerz criminals. Tac was given information on many of the events that were intended to happen in the year 2000, though when data on the Great Extinction is erased from his memory, Tac begins to question his usefulness. It is not until Sion convinces him that he is not worthless, that Tac feels confident in himself again. He can detect Space-Time Pulses and helps the team in making plans.

Wataru Asami
: Tatsuya's father who is the leader of the Asami Group, one of the largest business corporations in Japan. Wataru is a ruthless individual who is only concerned with business matters and tries to control Tatsuya's life, thinking that his son is only meant to succeed him. Wataru also organizes the City Guardians as a means of protecting the city from the Londerz Family and finds out that his son is Time Red when his helmet is broken. Wataru eventually agrees to allow Naoto to become the City Guardians' leader after he gains control of the V-Rex and attempts to recruit the other Timerangers into the City Guardians, but is turned down. Eventually, Wataru is hospitalized during Gien's attack on the City Guardian headquarters. After Yuuri and the Timerangers depart for 3000, Wataru decides to allow Tatsuya to live his own life until he feels that he is ready to join the Asami Group.

Wataru Asami is portrayed by  who previously played Dr. Dazai in Kousoku Sentai Turboranger.

Honami Moriyama
: Honami Moriyama is a reporter and photographer, the only one daring enough to take photographs of the Londerz Family. She first interferes in the Timerangers' battle against Gougan and is scolded by Time Pink for her foolishness, but Time Yellow is able to cheer her up. Unbeknownst to the Timerangers, Honami has taken their pictures while they are in their civilian forms, but she chooses to keep these pictures to herself, and quits taking pictures of them and the Londerz. Honami develops a crush on Time Yellow, yet she believes that Ayase is Time Yellow, going so far as keeping a picture of Ayase and Time Yellow side-by-side in her wallet. Sion finds out that Honami is in love with Domon and gives her his own e-mail address. Eventually, Domon finds out about the confusion when he notices Honami's wallet on the ground after he arrives late for a date and sees Ayase's picture in it. Domon tries to set up Honami with Ayase and, in the end, Honami's misunderstanding is cleared up when Domon is willing to protect her from Banjan's bomb. The two start dating and. at the end of the series, Honami has a child that she names Mirai, referred to as Domon Jr. in the finale (but she never tells Domon about it).

Time Robota
: Created by Sion to serve as Tac's robotic assistant, a cheerful and talkative little robot which often announces everything as "It's [blank] time!". Robota functions to protect their headquarters when the Timerangers are away. It relays messages, sounds off its opinions and, when Tac requires it, acts as an alarm clock.

Tatsumi family
Kyuukyuu Sentai GoGoFive: Team up with the Timerangers during Timeranger VS GoGoFive. They face off against Pierre, the surviving footman of the Psyma family (despite GoGoFive's assumptions that they had killed him), who teamed with the Londerz in a plan to take out both teams. During the Super Sentai Compilation's segment on GoGoFive, the team instantly recognizes them due to their team-up.

Arsenal
: The Timerangers' transformation device. The Timerangers can remove their regular clothes to reveal a special bodysuit and transform using the activation call . The Timerangers gain access to their weapons from the Chrono Changer through the command .
: The suits that are formed when the transformation devices are activated.
: A built-in scope that allows the Timerangers to analyze the enemy.
: This function is created by Sion in Episode 21. When activated, the speed of the Chrono Suits are increased, giving the Timerangers superhuman speed, but the durability of the suits decreases.
: A hoverjet that is used by the main Timeranger as regular transportation, as well as a transport for them to board the Time Jets.
: The badge of the Timerangers. The badges are used to identify the Timerangers as police officers, as well as to create a storage unit for a recaptured Londerz prisoner. Time Fire receives his own during Christmastime.
Some of the special attacks that can be performed are Vector Slash with the Spark Vector, as well as the Twin Slash attack. Both attacks are varieties of double sword-based attacks such as Vector Hurley and Vector End (by slashing in two directions in the symbol of a clock, such as Vector End Beat Six which is slashing between the 12 and 6 symbols, and Vector End Beat Cross, which is slashing between the 3 and 9 positions, and then the 12 and 6 positions).
: Time Red's VolUnit.
: Time Blue's VolUnit.
: Time Green's VolUnit.
: Time Yellow's VolUnit.
: Time Pink's VolUnit.
: A bazooka formed from the individual VolUnits.
:  Created in Episode 23 by Sion. The Assault Vector is a set of weapon pieces that are stored in a carrying case. The main purpose of the Assault Vector pieces is to combine with the Spark Vector. It can be wielded by any of the core Timerangers, but it is mostly used by Time Red.
: Time Fire's transformation device. Using the activation call , Naoto transforms into Time Fire. It is also used to remotely control the V-Rex/V-Rex Robo. When Naoto dies, he gives Tatsuya the V-Commander so he can have access to the DV Defender and V-Rex.
: Time Fire's personal weapon. It has three different forms that it can take through the  ability; the  where it becomes the  via , the  where a blade is extended from the front end of the gun to create a sword, and the  where an energy blade is produced from the front end of Vulcan Mode to perform the  finisher.

Other Vehicles
: The time vehicle which the Timerangers use to travel from the year 3000 to 2000.
: A tank created by the Asami Group. It was destroyed by Nova in its first run.

Emergency System
Mecha used by the Time Defense Bureau. While most mecha are launched from the Provider Base in the year 3000 when Tac calls "Emergency System, requesting activation!", the V-Rex remains in the present time. After a Londerz prisoner is defeated, a Timeranger says , or in Time Fire's case .
: Providus serves to send the Time Jets and Time Shadow through the time gate. Though he only saw action in Sion's dream, Providus has a spinning fist attack.
Time Jet 3D Mecha System: The Time Defense Bureau's Emergency System in case of enlarged Londerz prisoners, which Ryuuya sends to the Timeranger to prep them for the G-Zord. The five Time Jets can combine into any configuration by the command "3D Formation"/"Change Formation". As Time Jet Gamma, it can perform its  attack to throw the Londerz prisoners off-balance. With Virtual Movement, Time Robo Alpha can throw the Space-Time Sword over to the Time Shadow to use. Once the G-Zord is destroyed, the Time Jets are no longer sent to aid the Timerangers, and are last seen in the fight against Neo Crisis. Time Jet Gamma and Time Robo Alpha are visually similar to Jet Icarus, while Time Robo Beta is the same to Super Galaxy Mega.
Forms the frontal segment of Time Jet Gamma. Time Jet 1's underside is Time Robo Alpha's chest, while the topside is the chest of Time Robo Beta.
Forms Time Robo Alpha's left leg, Time Robo Beta's left arm, and Time Jet Gamma's right wing.
Forms Time Robo Alpha's right leg, Time Robo Beta's right arm, and Time Jet Gamma's left wing.
Forms Time Robo Alpha's left arm, Time Robo Beta's right leg, and the left "rudder" of Time Jet Gamma.
Forms Time Robo Alpha's right arm, Time Robo Beta's left leg, and the right "rudder" of Time Jet Gamma.
: Time Shadow is to be finished around 3015, but somehow finished early and sent to the 21st Century by the Inter-City Police Department to counter the temporal disruptions caused by Gien. Time Shadow forms the chest, wings, posterior, feet, and foot guards for both forms, as well as the shoulder cannons for Time Robo Shadow Alpha. The Time Shadow is last seen being taken down by the G-Zord and what becomes of it is unknown.
: The Inter-City Police's strongest mecha. It was lost in a time experiment and later emerges in the 21st century, where the Timerangers are. After recovering the V-Commander, the V-Rex's control device, and becoming Time Fire, Naoto gains control of the V-Rex shortly afterwards, using the command "Go, V-Rex!" to summon the V-Rex from the forest. V-Rex assumes a more human-like form, where its  are shot from its right hand and its  is fired from its left hand. V-Rex Robo's finisher, which allows it to recapture Londerz prisoners, is its  fired from the shoulders. By the command of "Reverse Formation, V-Rex!", it can return to its dinosaur form. Time Robo Alpha once rode on the V-Rex's back in an impromptu riding formation. In the finale, it is revealed that when the V-Rex and Neo-Crisis' power sources come in contact with each other, they create a time pulse that will take out bits of the world. Later, after Naoto dies, Sion is able to modify the DV Defender for Tatsuya to use the DV-Vulcan to alter the V-Rex's Lamba 2000 into Zeta-3, enabling Tatsuya to destroy Neo-Crisis without endangering the world.

Londerz Family
The  are the main antagonists of Timeranger.

Don Dolnero
 is a blue whale-like mafioso godfather who is only in it for the money, though he also has a firm love for the family. With Borg's help, he takes over a company to make even more money, setting up a "protection business". He cares for his associates, especially Gien, whose mental stability often concerns him. When Gien releases Emboss, Dolnero provides his blood to the Timerangers so the City Guardians can make the vaccine before he controls Gien with a shut down key to stop him from going too far in his psychotic delights. Once the shut down key is removed and destroyed, Dolnero evacuates the Londer Penitentiary before going out to kill Gien. Dolnero is unable to carry out the deed, only to be killed himself. Before his death, he gives the Timerangers the location of the remaining Londerz prisoners he had in the Londer Penitentiary. His name is a pun on the word, dinheiro.

Gien
 is an evil and insane robotic scientist. He is responsible for constructing the Zenitts that are sent against the Timerangers. Gien is actually a cyborg, formerly a mentally challenged human boy who can only count up to three before Don Dolnero teaches him to count to four, who befriends the criminal in 2990 when he is hiding from the Kronz family. The Kronz nearly kill Gien for not revealing Dolnero's location. Dolnero saves his life by having a friend of his transfer the boy's brain into a robotic body and connecting up a large electronic brain. There are horrible side-effects that have and are still driving Gien into madness. He has access to the Hell's Gate prisoners and cares for nothing except for his own masochistic pleasures, occasionally going against Dolnero's orders, as well. He has constructed several massive robots, powered by the Lambda-2000 crystal that he steals twice from the Kawasaki Laboratories. He attempts to take control of the V-Rex, as well. After seeing the G-Zord in action, Gien creates a device to drain the power from the G-Zord and then from the Timerangers robots. Eventually, Tatsuya arrives to help his friends, defeating Gien before destroying his device. Though the G-Zord is destroyed, Gien uses the Lambda-2000 he stole to assume his role as the "God of Destruction". Dolnero eventually tries everything in his power to stop Gien, only to die in his vain attempt. Gien later pilots the NeoCrisis robot, wired into his creation as he destroys everything in his path. After Tatsuya saves the future by destroying NeoCrisis, Gien's original personality resurfaces as he breaks part and dissolves away into sand. Despite his psychotic evil tendencies, Gien is one of the most tragic characters in the series.

Lila
: Don Dolnero's right hand girl with pink hair. Rather obnoxious, she is a mistress of disguise and good with a pistol. A material girl, she frequently steals clothing and jewelry that suit her fancy. She mostly sticks around Don Dolnero as he has two aspects she adores: money and power. She admits she likes him a bit, even if he lacks them. After Dolnero's death, Lila escapes the year 2001 to avoid the Great Extinction. Her name is a pun on the word, lira.

Zenitts
: Cheap one-eyed droids created by Gien from scrap, the Zenitts are activated when a Londerz criminal tosses a bunch of nuts and bolts that transform into one-eyed robots. The Zenitts are armed with sword-like rifles and can assume human form. When Gien leaves Dolnero, he takes most of the Zenitts with him to assist him in his plans, and upgraded their armor prior to the raid on the City Guardian headquarters, so the City Guardians' weapons would no longer have any effect on them.

Londerz Prisoners
In the 30th century, criminals are taken to Londer Penitentiary to be frozen and compressed for room. As a side effect, when a Depression Seal comes off, a prisoner grows to incredible size, called Rebound, as a side effect of the freeze-compression.

 : A ladybug-themed mad bomber, in for 120 years. He was first of the Londerz prisoners to be thawed and unleashed to cause havoc in the city, using his bombs to threaten the government into providing him cash. The Timerangers foiled his plans and Time Red wounded him. However, the attack exposed and removed the Depression Seal, causing Jekkar to grow and he started to attack the city. Were it not for Ryuuya's intervention, by activating the Emergency System, the Timerangers would have been killed in the ensuing chaos. Jekka was brought in by Time Robo Alpha after being overpowered by its Beta form. Voiced by Shigenori Sōya.
 : A water flea-like Martian placed in 50-year freeze-compression for using his kind's talent for controlling machines to steal 30  billion yen. He can hack into any computer and latch on any large machine, such as cars, to control it as if it was part of his own body. Brought in by Time Robo Alpha. Voiced by Dai Matsumoto.
 : The gecko-themed inventor of the Depression Seals who was placed in 200-year in freeze-compression for kidnapping and murder. He kidnapped Sion with no idea he was a Timeranger. Time Robo Alpha. Voiced by Yutaka Asukai, while his human form is portrayed by Kota Mori
 : A catfish-like hitman who likes killing, taking items from his victims as mementos. Sealed for 15 years with not enough proof to confirm his crimes, he was the one who murdered Yuuri's family. Though Yuuri attempted to kill him, her real objective was to learn the identity of the one who paid him to commit the act, who was Don Dolnero. Brought in by Time Robo Alpha after Yuuri gained her father's bracelet back from him. Voiced by Kazunari Tanaka. 
 : A swallow-themed flighty girl with a red eye who, like Lila, has an obsession for jewelry, and was jailed for making strike three. Copying the form of a woman, her victim is left unconscious from it. The bird tattoo on her neck is the only way to identify her while she is in disguise. Under the guise of Tenju, she steals the Moon King diamond for Lila to repay her for setting her free. When she attempts to steal the Moon Queen, the Timerangers interfere and she makes a run for it before fighting them. Time Red arrived in time to aid the others, but Time Yellow caused Rouge to enlarge by accident. Not wanting to be a giant, she reluctantly allowed Time Robo Alpha to bring her into custody. Her name is a pun on the word "rouge". Voiced by Hikari Tachibana. 
 : A surgical vivisection robot who was in for 500 years for medical malpractice. Brought in by Time Robo Alpha. His name is a pun on the word "doc". Voiced by Kazunori Arai. 
 : A robot who is able to assume jet form for swift kidnappings. He attempted to kidnap the future master artist Kengi Toba for Lila, dealing with the Timerangers and being wounded by them. After being repaired, he succeeds in his mission. The Timerangers arrived in time to save Toba, with Nabokov covering Lila's escape. Though hit by the Voltech Bazooka, he enlarges and battles Time Robo Beta before being brought in by Time Robo Alpha. Voiced by Tetsu Inada. 
 : A crooked cyborg traffic cop who was one of the Don's best friends, before Dolnero found Gien and Lila, using his authority as a police officer to mug people. Found by chance, Gien revives Dolnero's old friend, who intended to replace Gien and Lila to restart the Dolnero Family. However, though it pained him, Dolnero gave Arnold an upgrade for his weapon, though it was actually a bomb. As Arnold K is brought in by Time Robo, Dolnero explains that he chose his current family. voiced by Yutaka Aoyama 
 : A professional Oni-themed assassin. Don Dolnero promised 25 million to him if he killed the Timerangers. Possessing Herculean strength, he carries a broadsword and shoots lasers from his eyes in battle. Brought in by Time Robo Alpha. His name is a pun on the Japanese word for "ogre".  Voiced by Atsuki Tani.
 : An angel-motif criminal. Having the same regard for life as Gien, Gougan was arrested in 2975 for using his mind control machine to turn people into mobs to kill each other for his amusement during the night. Once freed by Gien, Gougan resumed his old habits, until the Timerangers destroyed his machine. Though defeated by Vector Dividing, Gougan enlarges and is brought in by Time Robo Alpha. Voiced by Motomu Kiyokawa. 
 : A master of blackmail with a laser whip weapon. He found a deserter from planet Arcturus named Argo and blackmailed him into using his teleporting powers steal for the Londerz. When Sion intervened, Gaymark took Hayato prisoner to keep Argo under his thumb. In the end, Sion manage to save Hayato and defeat Gaymark before he was brought in by Time Robo Alpha. Around New Year's Eve, Gaymark managed to break out of his confinement capsule, thanks to the landlady, though he was still in miniature form. Once the Timerangers found out, Gaymark took Time Robota as a hostage. He almost escaped, were it not for Domon's foot crushing him at the last second, the flattened Gaymark was put back in storage. Voiced by Kōzō Shioya
 : A small alien with a robotic/machine exosuit who was sentenced to 20 years in confinement. The small body is an octopus-themed creature and the robotic body he attaches to is lobster-themed. A casino owner who would fix the fights to win gambling bets. He used his exosuit to pose as the referee, taking advantage of the losing customers. The Timerangers found out by accident, while hired to look for Shinji Hosoki, who was a victim of Velito's deception. The Timerangers managed to flush Velito out, freezing him with the Voltech Bazooka before he had his exosuit set to autopilot and enlarge itself. As it was only an exosuit and not a criminal, it was destroyed by Time Robo Beta. Voiced by Tetsuo Mizutori while his human form is portrayed by Diamond Katsuta. 
 : A former hotshot race car driver and friend of Ayase. Baron was previously convicted with Ayase's testimony for reckless driving that resulted in a hurt driver. Released by Lila to serve as her personal driver, Baron has a grudge against Ayase for betraying him. But after challenging Ayase to another race, Ayase helped Baron see the error of his ways when he got in the way of Baron's car to avoid hitting some pedestrians. However, an angry Lila took control of him using a handheld device, giving him a stronger armor that took control of his actions. The Timerangers were able to break him free from this control, however. Brought in by Time Robo Alpha. Voiced by Eiji Hanawa while his human form is portrayed by Aoi Ozawa
 : A professional plant-themed assassin in for 120 years that was released by Don Dolnero to assassinate the Timerangers, though she was only willing to do it for seven million dollars per each ranger. She uses a unique type of laser that allows her to penetrate the Timeranger's Chrono Suits. Reihou kidnapped Honami Moriyama after her publisher published an article claiming that she knew who the Timerangers are without her permission, and placed a bomb around Honami's neck as she placed her in an open square in a trap to shoot the Timerangers from a distance. With planning, Time Green and Time Pink were able to save Honami while Time Red, Time Blue, and Time Yellow battled Reihou. Once the team gathered, Reihou enlarged herself. Brought in by Time Robo Alpha. Voiced by Emi Uwagawa.
 : An insect/pig-themed food critic gone mad, who was sentenced for 180 years, though he was released by Gien. Armed with a fork-staff and able to shoot fire from his mouth, he attacked people whose cooking he found horrible, burning their eating establishments to the ground. When he burned down the soba shop run by Sugawara, Domon took it personally. Using the soba he gave him, by Tac, believed to be from the future, Domon uses it to beat Vincent in a bet. Though losing, Vincent refused to be frozen willingly, as he agreed to, and enlarges. Though he took advantage of civilian hostages, Time Robo Beta managed to knock him out of the way before Time Robo Alpha brought him into custody. Voiced by Don Kantaro.
 : A gangster in a green mohawk who was released by Lila to increase money supply for the Londerz. Assuming the guise of a teacher, he took over Nanjo Middle School, conditioning strong students to bully and extort the weaker students. One of those bullied students happened to be Makoto Urawa, who became Flan's new puppet. Tatsuya managed to talk Makoto out of Flan's scheme. After being beaten up by Time Red, Flan enlarges. Brought in by Time Robo after fighting all three of its formations. Voiced by Hideo Ishikawa while his human form is portrayed by Takako Inayoshi.
 : Gien used this shotgun-wielding cyborg hammerhead shark-themed terrorist to retrieve the Lambda 2000. Gien planned to use the Lambda 2000 by turning it into a Zeta 3 crystal to power his first giant robot, Nova. Sandoora successfully invaded Kawasaki Research Lab, putting the area in lockdown. Ayase managed to deactivate the lockdown so the others could run in as Sandoora obtained the Lambda 2000. Confronted by Time Yellow, Time Pink, and Time Green, he blasted them with his shotgun before Time Red and Time Blue arrived to block his escape. Though he was defeated by the Timerangers and lost the Lambda 2000, Sandoora enlarged himself. Though he managed to severely damage Time Robo Beta with his grenades and rifle, Sandoora was brought in by a weakened Time Robo Alpha as Gien took the Lambda 2000 to convert it into Zeta 3. Voiced by Jun Ishimaru
 : A samurai/bee stinger-themed criminal who was given 105 years for murder as a mafia bodyguard. He was released by Don Dolnero to aid him in his distribution of the Power Spritty, a neo-alcohol from the 30th century that could severely intoxicate humans, with aliens being unaffected by it. Being immune to the effects of the neo-alcoholic drink, Sion was forced to fight Hydrid single handedly with the Accel Stop function on his Chrono Suit, chemically changing the Power Spritty supply in the process. Hydrid enlarged himself before the Voltech Bazooka could be used on him. With Sion handling the control systems, Time Robo Shadow Alpha brought Hydrid into custody. Voiced by Masaharu Satō.
 : A Gorgon-like prisoner who was arrested for her ability to seduce men and then rip them off into giving her money after they became obsessed with her under the disguise of the beautiful Kyouko Hirosue. Released by Lila so she could use Barbera's talents to make money for the Londerz. Among her victims were Tatsuya, Ayase, and Domon, whom she tried to force to kill each other after learning that they were all Timerangers. She tried to do this using her enchanted snakes to take control of them. Defeated single-handedly by Yuuri after she uses her own newly gained sex appeal to snap the three out of their trance. Though hit with the Voltech Bazooka, Barbera enlarged, and was soon brought in by Time Robo Shadow Alpha. Voiced and portrayed by Chika Kochihira. 
 : A caterpillar-themed Marshallian in for 3 years due to his reckless energy consumption. What makes him dangerous is his kind's ability to unleashes a flash radiation upon being wounded. He was released by Gien, under the assumption that the Londerz could take advantage of the blackouts he causes with this ability. Time Red attempted to stop him on his own, only to be hurt by the ensuing radiation. Uugo eventually made his way to the power plant, where Gien was stationed and planned to make Uugo discharge every wattage of power to destroy the entire city. The Timerangers interfered, with Time Red using the Assault Vector to defeat him while removing his energy after luring the alien away from the plant. Gien forcefully enlarged Uugo, who was soon brought in by Time Robo Shadow Beta. Voiced by Takashi Nagasako
 : An axe-themed bomber in for 10 years, he was released to cause trouble with his love for violence. The violence he caused allowed Don Dolnero to set up his own company in the aftermath. He pursued Ayase and Honami, with Ayase holding him at bay before Time Yellow arrived. When he knocked Honami unconscious, Time Yellow and Time Blue double-teamed him. Borg enlarged afterwards, only to be brought in by Time Robo Shadow Alpha. His name is a pun on the word "borg", a type of cyborg race from "Star Trek". Voiced by Kōsuke Toriumi. 
 : Arrested for using people in experiments to create a space within space only to fail. Being a turtle-like criminal, he had an obsession for turtles. Released by Don Dolnero, he was paid 50 million to eliminate the Timerangers. He managed to trap the Timerangers in the Genbu Zone, composed of various pocket dimensions of his making based on his research, sicking his , copies of the Timerangers, on them. Only Time Red and Time Pink escaped the dimension, later managing to use an "in-sync battle plan" to destroy the Genbu Zone and the Timeranger copies from the inside out without harming their friends in the process. Once the copy was destroyed, Genbu was brought in by Time Robo Shadow Beta. He is named after the constellation tortoise of the same name, "Genbu". Voiced by Keiichi Sonobe. 
 : A three-eyed beautician who would do anything for money, whether it was legal or not. She was released to help Lila in her leisure at a resort for 10 million yen. By poisoning the sea with Bloody Labor cannonball-like poison tablets, she gathered red poisoned seaweed for a seaweed wrap facial the next day, hoping that Lila would pay 3 times what she promised. Taking her pollution deeds personally, Sion attacked Domiiro until the others arrived to pursue her as Tac and Time Robota restored the sea. Though defeated by Time Green, she enlarged, only to be brought in by Time Robo Shadow Alpha. Voiced by Akemi Misaki. 
 : A cocoon-themed weapons-user with a brick-patterned neck released by Gien to track down the pulse sent from the V-Rex's control unit. He battled the Timerangers, while the Zenitts tracked down the V-Rex's control unit for him. Naoto gained the unit before the Londerz could, becoming Time Fire for the first time and using his DV Refreezer ability to bring Hammer into custody. Voiced by Takahiro Yoshimizu. 
 : This hunting-themed robot was released by Gien to track down the V-Rex and was able to partially control it with a spear which had a small joystick-like remote control on it. He later enlarged himself so he and the V-Rex could double team Shadow Alpha. Once Time Fire freed it of Master Hunter's control, the V-Rex assumed V-Rex Robo form and brought Master Hunter into custody. Voiced by Tetsu Inada. 
 : A seahorse-themed mental counselor who went bad and used his Mind Modulator to damage his patients' minds, forcing them back and gaining more money. Once they were broke, Zektar would imprison them and use them in his experiments. Domon investigated, only to supposedly suffer psychologically as a result. Domon turned the tables and broke free of the Mind Modulator. Infuriated, Zektar enlarged and uses what he learned from Time Yellow's mind to counter Time Robo Shadow Beta, until V-Rex Robo arrived and uses Max Blizzard to bring Zektar into custody. Voiced by Ryōichi Tanaka while his human form is portrayed by Hiroshi Omori. 
 : A jellyfish/squid-themeed criminal. Arrested for making bombs, unaware they would be used for crimes, D.D. Ladis was labeled an accomplice and was sentenced for 20 years in suspended animation, undergoing freeze-compression right before Don Dolnero. Though thawed, Don Dolnero was going to kill D.D. Ladis for being useless until Gien implanted an irremovable hypnopierce to make him obedient. D.D. Ladis manages to escape due to the hypnopierce's controller calibration being off, with Time Green saving him from both the Londerz and Time Fire. Once the controller was properly calibrated, D.D. Ladis was forced on the Timerangers before enlarging himself. While the others piloted Time Robo Shadow Alpha, Time Green used the Assault Vector's Sniper Mode to blast the hypnopierce off of D.D. Ladis. With Time Fire fighting Gien off before calling the V-Rex to hold D.D. Ladis, Time Green fired the shot that freed D.D. Ladis while Time Robo Shadow Alpha re-froze him. Voiced By Yasuhiko Kawazu
 : A hammerhead shark-themed criminal with a lobster-like claw for a right hand that shoots energy blasts. He ran a loan shark business for the Don, kidnapping the family of bankers in debt to the Don. One of the bankers' daughter, Emiri Sakurai, escaped Dogoal's men and was soon under Ayase's protection, taking her to Mt. Asagiri where she and her family used to have fun before her mom died. Dogoal managed to catch up to them and battled Time Blue while the other Timerangers saved Mr. Sakurai. Through defeated by Time Blue, Dogoal enlarged as the others arrived and formed Time Robo Shadow Alpha with the V-Rex supporting it, using a combo Blizzard Slash/Max Blizzard to bring him into custody. Voiced by Kōji Totani while his human form is portrayed by Shinzo Hotta. 
 : An Inter-City police officer who turned villainous and became an assassin, using a mind control gas to recruit others into his assassin group. He was arrested by the Inter-City police at Yuuri's request, whom he became obsessed with, only to be released to make money for Dolnero. He had a reputation for doing business with other unsavory underworld figures as well. Deciding to investigate, she joins the assassin group to find Abel. Abel outsmarts her and uses his mind control gas on her, turning her into his ideal pupil to finish the assassination attempt his subordinate failed to accomplish. Time Red intervened and saved Yuuri, giving her the antidote. Once she regained control, Time Pink defeated Abel, but he enlarged and was quickly brought in by Time Robo Shadow Beta with some help from V-Rex Robo. Voiced by Hikaru Midorikawa. 
 : A big-brained master hacker carrying an extra electronic brain on the end of his cane, making him a super genius. Under the guise of an old man, he uploaded a computer virus into every hospital mainframe, demanding fifty million yen for each patient for the anti-virus he possessed. Tatsuya and Naoto managed to find Jugend, but the fight resulted with Naoto suffering from déjà vu from the D-sensor, being hit by Jugend's attack, and having to relive October 22 over and over. Time Red's shielding of a blast freed Naoto from the loop, allowing Time Fire and Time Red to defeat Jugend. However, Jugend enlarged and reprogrammed the Time Shadow to fight Time Robo Beta until V-Rex Robo undid Jugend's hacking. All three robots brought him into custody. Voiced by Yoshiyuki Kono
 : A pond loach/martial artist-themed criminal. He sold deadly bombs to gangsters, until City Guardians went in disguise to arrange a setup to find his hideout. Events when out of control when a young thief (Reiji from Kyuukyuu Sentai GoGoFive) took both suitcases and uses the Tomorrow Research to deliver the package to him at Harumi Port. Banjan uses a matching weapon controller's waves to track down the thief's location, with the thief saved shortly after by Time Red and Time Pink, while Time Green set up a jamming signal. Infuried, Banjan rebounded and was then brought in by Time Robo Shadow Alpha. Voiced by Hisanori Nemoto. 
 : A squid-themed designer of various robots, his most famous being the V-Rex. He was released by Gien, even though it was under Dolnero's order. Using it as an excuse to have fun, Mayden abducted Naoto and forced him to summon the V-Rex. From there, Mayden was able to take control of it by a voice-masking device to copy Naoto's voice. While Time Shadow battled the V-Rex, the male Timerangers dealt with Mayden until Naoto managed to regain control of the V-Rex and take back the V-Commander. Mayden was soon after brought in by a DV Refreezer Slash/Voltech Bazooka combo. His name is similar in pun to the word "mayday". Voiced by Yoshio Kawai while his human form is portrayed by Hakobu Okubo. 
 : A film director-themed criminal armed with a megaphone. In Sion's dream, the Timerangers were visited by producer Junichi Machida who gave the team a job to investigate the possible embezzlement from the director at the Tokyo Ninja Story sequel. Once the film's new title was revealed, "The End of the Timeranger," Glokan revealed himself and used his directing powers to mess with the Timerangers and place the gang in various genres from yakuza, to Hong Kong, extreme sports/fantasy, and then action. Glokan brought in the criminals arrested by the Timerangers for the big fight scene during the action film, but when Domon offends him, Glokan decides to forward to the climax, enlarging himself as he placed the Timerangers in Time Robo Shadow Beta for his cameo before writing in Naoto, V-Rex, and then Providus. The Timerangers' attacks were ineffective against Glokan as his movie magic made him invincible. When Time Robo Shadow Beta made a hit, it turned out the last page of Glokan's was gone – as Sion used it to get Shingo Ogata's autograph, thus saving the gang. With Glokan horrified that he had no ending to his film, the Timerangers aimed to create it – bringing in Glokan with the power of all the robots. Voiced and portrayed by Mansaku Fuwa.
 : A chameleon-themed thief sent by Dolnero to steal the soon-to-be-completed Reda Virus vaccine from the City Guardians, so they could sell it to make a great profit out of its importance after it is finished. Time Fire attempts to get the vaccine away from Dorpa before Time Blue battled him, leaving Dorpa open for attack by Time Red, Pink, and Green. Angered, Dorpa enlarged himself and battled Time Robo Shadow Beta and V-Rex Robo before being brought into custody. Voiced by Daisuke Kishio. 
 : A telekinetic false prophet who was arrested for making money on the followers he amassed with his false prophecy that the Earth would come to an end in 3001. Released by Don Dolnero and creating the figurehead Hakuou, Strauss set up another doomsday cult with his false prophecy set for 2001. Tatsuya and Yuuri investigated on Domon's orders, exposing Strauss' scheme as Time Fire arrived. Once the team gathered, Time Red and Time Pink double teamed Strauss, forcing him to enlarge with Time Robo Shadow Beta and the V-Rex facing him. In the end, Time Robo Shadow Beta brought Strauss in as his cult disbanded. However, both of Strauss's prophecies would later be revealed to have had some truth to them. Voiced and portrayed by Masahiro Noguchi. 
 : An arrogant giant girdled lizard-themed figure, he opts out of being refrozen for the Londerz to escape the Great Extinction of 2001 and instead plans to hold the Space Research Institute for ransom by blowing up a reactor if one billion yen is not paid in an hour. Gate accidentally sped up the countdown from thirty to three minutes and decided to escape when Time Fire and the City Guardians arrive. While Tac cancels the self-destruct sequence (with Time Yellow and Time Red holding a blast door open to stall for time), Time Fire and Gate decide to compete in a duel. Gate enlarged and battled with the V-Rex, while the Timerangers were denied use of their Time Jets. With the Time Flyer instead, V-Rex Robo was able to bring Gate into custody. Voiced by Ryōtarō Okiayu.

Hell's Gate Prisoners
These are Londerz prisoners confined for the most evil and inhuman acts of the 30th century. Only Gien has the key to the vault that holds them, and he thaws them out so they can terrorize everyone for his own amusement and kill the Timerangers for himself.

 : A toy-themed criminal imprisoned for the murder of 1,030 people. He was released by Gien, proving his notorious reputation true by killing civilians with small bombs that resemble 20th century toy tops as well as with his rifle. He overpowered the Timerangers before he was later brought in by Time Robo Shadow Beta. Voiced by Eiji Ito.
 : He was released by Gien to locate a space-time pulse and strengthen it with a machine. Wielding a nasty firearm, Jagur wounded Time Red, revealing the man's true identity to his father and Naoto. Time Red managed to wound Jagur long enough for him to be brought in by the Voltech Bazooka. Before being recaptured, Jagur succeeded in strengthening the space-time pulse that would to out of control and allow the V-Rex to emerge. Voiced by Ryuugo Saito. 
 : A Scream-inspired criminal who was infected with a fatal disease, a bio-weapon known as the Reda Virus. Even if a cure was made for him, it was too late for him and he wanted to take others by the thousands down with him for revenge. He thought he would succeed in spreading his disease across the city, until Gien arrived and revealed that only he will die, freaking Emboss out as he became determined to destroy the case with Dolnero's blood while knocking the Timerangers away. Time Blue rescued the case and the rest of the team defeated Emboss. He was enlarged before being brought in with Time Robo Shadow Alpha & V-Rex Robo. His name is a pun on the word "emboss". Voiced by Takahiro Natsui. 
 : A destructive, murderous, walrus-themed creature armed with a bazooka. Harbal was released by Gien to obtain the Lambda 2000 from the 3rd R&D Lab. While Gien fought the Timerangers, he battled Time Fire in a fight that critically wounded Mr. Asami. Once Time Fire defeats him, Harbal enlarged himself and battled the V-Rex. Though Harbal was brought in by V-Rex Robo, Gien escapes with the Lambda 2000, thanks to Ryuuya's help. His name is a pun on the word "hairball". Voiced by Kenji Nomura

Robots
: A Zenitt-headed robot created by Gien and powered by Zeta 3. Supposedly put through the freezing-compression system and unleashed, Gien enlarges his creation to destroy the city. With Time Robo still damaged from its fight with Sandoora, the Raimei is deployed to destroy the robot, but Nova proves superior and destroys the Raimei with little trouble. Everything seems hopeless until Time Shadow arrives, able to withstand Nova's arsenal and destroy the fierce robot.
: A powerful dragon-themed energy reactor robot that was lost in a time experiment like the V-Rex in 2994. Though immune to all forms of external attacks, its only weak point is its mute-energy reactor. An attack on it is enough to destroy it with a 20-centimeter diameter heat vent connecting to the reactor. The G-Zord appears in the 20th century after Ryuuya arrives to negate the end of the 30th century by taking over Tatsuya's position as Time Red to form Time Robo Shadow Beta and aim for the heat vent. Gien provokes the G-Zord into combat mode as the V-Rex arrives, with the G-Zord retreating to heal itself. Once healed, the G-Zord resumes its attack on the city. With Time Robo Beta and Time Shadow fighting the robot, Gien uses his machine to siphon the mute-energy from the G-Zord, leaving it partially active, and to disable the Timerangers' powers and robots until Tatsuya destroys the machine and restores their powers. After the Timerangers convince Ryuuya to give the Chrono Changer back to Tatsuya, Tatsuya is able to come up with a strategy to allow the Timerangers to defeat the G-Zord for good by having Time Robo Alpha ride on the V-Rex's back in a riding formation, then jump off to move in from behind and strike the G-Zord's weak spot with its sword. While the G-Zord's remains are taken by Gien, its destruction not only saves the 30th century but alters its history as well with the Great Extinction coming in 2001.
: A robot with an axe for a right hand and a machine gun for a left hand. Created by Gien and powered by Zeta-3, Crisis is sent to destroy the city. Time Fire and the Timerangers battle it until it enlarges itself, with the V-Rex and Time Flyer fighting it. Once he hears it is a robot and that they can destroy it, Time Fire uses the V-Rex's Max Burning to scrap the robot.
: Gien's final robot. NeoCrisis resembles Gien and was created by him to battle the V-Rex. Powered by Lambda-2000, it is also programmed to synchronize with its creator's movements. Once fully functional and enlarged, Gien pilots NeoCrisis to begin his reign of destruction. Time Fire arrives, with the V-Rex, and the two giants engage in a battle, which also ensures the Great Extinction of 2001. After defeating the V-Rex, Gien decides to find something else for NeoCrisis to destroy, while space-time worsens until the robot starts to overheat. Gien falls back to make repairs and to plan the actual date of when a third of the world is to be destroyed. During its second attack, NeoCrisis overpowers the V-Rex until Time Jet Gamma arrives and disables NeoCrisis for a moment. Time Robo Alpha holds off NeoCrisis as Time Red converts the V-Rex's Lambda-2000 to Zeta-3. Once Time Robo Beta puts NeoCrisis in position after the conversion is complete (due to the V-Rex not being able to move), the robot is eventually destroyed by the V-Rex's Max Burning, causing Gien to shut down, break apart, and dissolve into nothing as a result.

Episodes (Case Files)
Each episode ends or begin with a date (usually the date the episode aired), in keeping with the case file theme.

V-Cinema releases

Mirai Sentai Timeranger Super Video: All the Strongest Hero Secrets
This is a direct-to-video release made specifically for Mirai Sentai Timeranger. It talks about the Timerangers' story so far and showcases the Timerangers' weapons and mecha.

Mirai Sentai Timeranger vs. GoGoFive
Direct-to-video movie released on March 9, 2001. Taking place on October 25, 2000, between cases 35 and 36, the Timerangers confront the Londerz prisoner Boribaru, who somehow resists the Voltech Bazooka and runs off. This infuriates Matoi Tatsumi who, with his siblings, are dealing with the fire Boribaru caused to call the Timerangers out, and he criticizes the Timerangers for lacking any spirit. Later, unaware of their civilian identities, the Tatsumi siblings arrive at Tomorrow Research to get help in finding their father, who mysteriously disappeared, along with their GoGo Braces. When Tac alerts them to a Londerz attack, the Timerangers confront relatives of the Londerz prisoners they defeated with the Tatsumi siblings watching them transform from afar. By then, it is revealed that the Londerz prisoners' new-found invincibility is the work of Spell Master Pierre, the surviving servant of the Psyma family. However, just as Pierre is about to get his revenge, Mondo comes to his children's aid and gives them their GoGo Braces to help the Timerangers. The two Sentai teams fight the prisoners until Pierre makes Boribaru powerful enough to create a space-time distortion that sucks all combatants into pocket dimensions. While others fight for their lives against the prisoners with their transformation devices disabled, Pierre tries to stop Mondo from getting the Sentai teams back until Time Fire intervenes. Having Naoto call in V Rex, who scares Pierre away, Tac links himself to its Chrono Unit while having Naoto order his robot to create a time hole for the teams to assume their Sentai forms and defeat the prisoners, while returning to their time. With Time Fire joining in, the Timerangers and GoGoFive manage to freeze the Londerz relatives. However, left behind by Don Dolnero and his group, Pierre is forced to use a Psyma Fusion spell with Boribaru to become Pierre Bori, who overpowers Time Shadow Alpha, reverting it to Time Robo Alpha and Time Shadow. But in a gambit that could tear apart the fabric of time, Mondo takes advantage to Time Robo's hammer time space to call MaxLiner and GoLiner from 1999 so the GoGoFive can form Victory Robo. With Victory Robo transferring the energies of its Victory Prominence to Time Robo, it assumes Riding Time Robo Formation to V Rex to execute Pressure Prominence to both destroy Pierre and arrest Boribaru. Soon after, as the GoGoFive mecha return to 1999, the two sentai teams part on good terms.

Cast
, :  (Played as "永井 マサル")
: 
: 
: 
:  (Played as )
: 
: 
: 
: 
Narration: Yukitoshi Hori (堀 之紀 Hori Yukitoshi)

Voice actors
: 
: 
: 
:

Songs
Opening theme

Lyrics: 
Composition & Arrangement: Kōichirō Kameyama
Artist: 

Ending theme

Lyrics: 
Composition & Arrangement: Kōichirō Kameyama
Artist: Nat's
"Beyond All Space and Time"
Artist: 
Timeranger vs. GoGo Fives ending theme. An English version of the series opening theme.

Lyrics: Kiyomi Katō
Composition & Arrangement: Kōichirō Kameyama
Artist: T.R.Futures (Masaru Nagai (Tatsuya), Mika Katsumura (Yuuri), Yuuji Kido (Ayase), Shuhei Izumi (Domon), Masahiro Kuranuki (Sion))
Episode 44's ending theme
"Eternal Wind"
Lyrics: Takako Shingetsu
Composition & Arrangement: Kōtarō Nakagawa
Artist: Naritaka Takayama
Episode 45's ending theme

Lyrics: Yoshie Isogai
Composition, Arrangement, & Performance: Motoyoshi Iwasaki
Final episode's ending theme
"Don't Stop Your Story!"
Lyrics: Yukari Yamato
Composition & Arrangement: Taku Iwasaki
Artist: T.R.Futures
Special Compilation's ending theme

International Broadcasts and Home Video
In Thailand, the series has had some complications towards the handling of publication. At first, TIGA Company had the original distribution rights to the series in the region and it was released with a Thai dub. It was initially readily available on VHS during its' original Japanese broadcasting at the time. But only 5 tapes were released with ten episodes (two episodes per tape), due to a change in distributors between TIGA and Rose Company. This caused a temporary cease in releases at the time, which TiGA ended up releasing Seijuu Sentai Gingaman instead during this period. Then in 2001, Rose then had the rights to release it on home video, this time on VCD, which had all episodes released except for the very last episode, which did not get a Thai dub. By still using the team of TIGA as before according to the conditions set by TIGA in addition, it then later aired on TV in 2002 on Channel 5 in full with all 50 episodes dubbed. But when Rose Company got the rights to the Mirai Sentai Timeranger vs. GoGoFive crossover movie to be released in the region, it had new voice actors and new translations which are different from TIGA's.
In Malaysia, the series aired with a Malay dub produced by FKN Dubbing on TV2 around 2005 and finished around 2006, marketed as simply Time Ranger.''''' It was also released on VCD and DVD.
In North America, the series would receive a DVD release by Shout! Factory on July 31, 2018 in the original Japanese audio with English subtitles. It is the ninth Super Sentai series to be officially released in the region.

References

External links

 at Super-Sentai.net
 Official Shout! Factory page
Official Shout! Factory Tv page

Super Sentai
2000 Japanese television series debuts
2001 Japanese television series endings
Fiction set in the 30th century
Japanese action television series
Japanese fantasy television series
Japanese science fiction television series
Japanese time travel television series
Television series set in the 3rd millennium
Television series set in the future
Television shows written by Yasuko Kobayashi